The 2018–19 season was the Tractor Sports Club’s 11th season in the Iran Pro League, and their 10th consecutive season in the top division of Iranian football. They will also be competed in the Hazfi Cup, and 48th year in existence as a football club.

Players

First team squad
As of 3 September 2018.

Transfers

In

Out

Coaching staff
As of 13 January 2018.

Pre-season and friendlies

Competitions

Overview

Persian Gulf Pro League

Standings

Results summary

Results by round

Matches

Hazfi Cup

Statistics

Squad statistics

|-
! colspan=14 style=background:#dcdcdc; text-align:center| Players transferred out during the season

Goalscorers

Last updated: 30 March 2018

Clean sheets

Last updated: 30 March 2019

References

Tractor S.C. seasons
Tractor Sazi